Millwall Dock is a dock at Millwall, London, England, located south of Canary Wharf on the Isle of Dogs.

History

The scheme was developed speculatively by a partnership of John Kelk and John Aird & Co. The engineer responsible for designing the scheme was Sir John Fowler. The construction was undertaken by Kelk and Aird and the dock was officially opened in March 1868. After a slow start to the business and financial difficulties, Kelt and Aird surrendered control of the company to lawyers acting for the investors in December 1868. In recognition of its settled status the business was renamed the Millwall Dock Company in 1870.

From 1897 to 1921, it was served by the Millwall Docks railway station on the Millwall Extension Railway, with goods services continuing to the 1970s. 

In 1909 the Port of London Authority (PLA) took over the Millwall Dock, along with the other enclosed docks from St Katharines to Tilbury.

From 1905 Magnus Mowat worked as Engineer to the docks, being promoted to Director around 1912. 

With reorganisation by the Port of London Authority in the 1920s, the northern end of the Inner Dock was connected to the West India Docks by the Millwall Passage.

The dock was used mainly for timber and grain, a trade which eventually moved down river to the Port of Tilbury with the construction of a major grain terminal in the 1960s. A McDougall's flour mill, the Wheatsheaf Mill (constructed in 1869), stood on the south side of the Outer Dock, but was demolished in about 1980. Nearby Sir John McDougall Gardens is named after one of the McDougall brothers, John McDougall, who was also a prominent local politician in Poplar.

From the 1960s onwards, the Millwall Dock experienced a steady decline – as did all of London's other docks – as the shipping industry adopted containerisation, which effectively moved traffic downstream to Tilbury. It finally closed to commercial traffic along with the other Royal Docks in 1981.

The West Ferry Printing Works, the largest newspaper print works in Western Europe, was built on the north side of Outer Dock between 1984 and 1986.

The Docklands Sailing and Watersports Centre, located at the far West end of the dock where the dock previously connected to the Thames,  was established by the London Docklands Development Corporation and the Sports Council at a cost of £1.2 million in 1989.

While much of the area has been occupied by commercial office towers, Millwall Dock is also an area where several housing developments and apartment towers have been developed. During the 1980s the Clippers Quay housing estate was built around the old dry dock while the Mill Quay housing development was built on the site of the old Wheatsheaf Mill.

The dock was a location for boat stunts in the 1999 James Bond film The World Is Not Enough.

Layout
The dock is L-shaped, with an 'Outer Dock' running east–west, and an 'Inner Dock' running north from the eastern end. It originally contained around 36 acres (14 hectares) of water and had a 200-acre (81 hectare) estate. The spoil from the docks formed the area of wasteland known as the Mudchute.

References

Other sources
 
 'Dockland: An illustrated historical survey of life and work in east London', NELP/GLC, 1983,

External links 
 Docklands Light Railway
 Mill Quay Residents Association

Geography of the London Borough of Tower Hamlets
History of the London Borough of Tower Hamlets
Buildings and structures in the London Borough of Tower Hamlets
London docks
Port of London
Millwall